Marcello Pera (born 28 January 1943) is an Italian philosopher and politician. He was the President of the Italian Senate from 2001 to 2006.

Career
Pera, who was born in Lucca,⁣ graduated in accounting, and he worked for the Banca Toscana and for the Camera di Commercio in Lucca. He went on to study philosophy at the University of Pisa, concentrating on the works of Karl Popper and his open society theory, and advocating these principles during the difficult 1970s, the anni di piombo.

His academic career began 1976 at the University of Pisa. He then went on to pursue research activities internationally: Fulbright scholar, University of Pittsburgh, 1984; Linguistics and Philosophy, MIT, Cambridge, Massachusetts, 1990; visiting fellow, Centre for the Philosophy of Natural Sciences, London School of Economics, 1995–96. He taught theoretical philosophy from 1989 to 1992 at the University of Catania. In 1992 he became full professor of philosophy at the University of Pisa.

Marcello Pera has written for the newspapers Corriere della Sera, Il Messaggero, and La Stampa, and to the news magazines L'Espresso and Panorama.

Pera has become a leading opponent of post-modernism and cultural relativism and on this subject he resonates with religious thinkers.

Opposing cultural relativism, he declared, "There are good reasons for deeming that some institutions are better than others. And I deny that such a judgement must necessarily lead to a clash."

Opposing the postmodern denial of the possibility of ascertaining objective facts, he says, "Against deconstructionism, I do not deny that facts do not exist without interpretation. I refute Nietzsche's thesis that "there are no facts, only interpretations" (F. Nietzsche, Afterthoughts); or Derrida's "there is nothing beyond the text" (J. Derrida, Of Grammatology)."

In the Senate
He was elected as a Senator for Forza Italia in 1996 and 2001. During the XIV Legislature, he was President of the Senate from May 30, 2001 to April 27, 2006. He was re-elected to the Senate in 2006 and 2008.

Dialogue with Pope Benedict XVI
An atheist, Pera co-authored a book with then Cardinal Joseph Ratzinger, titled Senza radici ("Without Roots"), and is the author of the introduction to the book originally titled L'Europa di Benedetto nella crisi delle culture,  or in short, The Europe of Benedict, written by Ratzinger shortly before he became the pope. It has been reprinted as Christianity and the Crisis of Cultures.

Pera's 2008 book Perché dobbiamo dirci cristiani ("Why We Must Call Ourselves Christians"), has a letter-preface by Pope Benedict XVI.

Pera is a critic of the policies of Pope Francis and his attempts to influence Italian politics, in particular his response to the European migrant crisis; he has accused the Pope of demanding that European states "commit suicide."

Honour

Foreign honour
  : Honorary Grand Commander of the Order of the Defender of the Realm (2003)
  : Grand Cordon of the Medal of the Oriental Republic of Uruguay (2003)

Publications

 Induzione e metodo scientifico, Pera M., Editrice Tecnico Scientifica, Pisa, 1978
 Popper e la scienza su palafitte, Pera M., Laterza, Roma-Bari, 1981
 Hume, Kant e l'induzione, Pera M., Il Mulino, Bologna, 1982
 Apologia del Metodo, Pera M., Laterza, Roma-Bari, 1982
 La Rana ambigua. La controversia sull'eletricità tra Galvana e Volta, Pera M., Einaudi, Torino, 1986; English translation The Ambiguous Frog: The Galvani-Volta Controversy on Animal Electricity, Princeton University Press, Princeton 1991
 Scienza e retorica, Pera M., Laterza, Roma-Bari, 1992; translated into English and revised as The Discourses of Science, (Chicago University Press, Chicago 1994
 Senza radici/Without Roots, Pera M., Ratzinger J., Mondadori, Milano 2004, Basic Books, New York 2006; German edition: Sankt Ulrich Verlag, Augsburg 2005; Spanish edition: Peninsula, Barcelona 2006
 
 Perché dobbiamo dirci cristiani ("Why We Must Call Ourselves Christians"), Mondadori, Milano 2008; with a letter-preface by Pope Benedict XVI

References

External links
 Marcello Pera's official site (in Italian and English)

1943 births
Living people
Politicians from Lucca
Conservatism in Italy
Italian journalists
Italian male journalists
20th-century Italian philosophers
21st-century Italian philosophers
Forza Italia politicians
The People of Freedom politicians
Presidents of the Italian Senate
20th-century Italian politicians
Hudson Institute
Communion and Liberation
University of Pisa alumni
Academic staff of the University of Pisa
20th-century Italian male writers